The Annie Award for Best Animated Special Production is an Annie Award, given annually to a non-theatrical animated production since 2011.

Winners

2010s

2020s

Multiple wins and nominations

Wins
DreamWorks Animation-2

Nominations (3 or more)
DreamWorks Animation-5 (2 wins)
Warner Bros. Animation-4 (no wins)

See also
 Primetime Emmy Award for Outstanding Animated Program

References

External links
 Official website

Awards established in 2011
Annie Awards
2011 establishments in the United States